Alter is the fifth studio album by American rock band Floater, released in 2002.

Track listing
"Zero Hour" – 6:18
"Come See Everything" – 5:11
"Crusatyr" – 4:36
"Alone" – 5:39
"Tracks Across the Snow" – 5:36
"Rocking Horse" – 5:39
"Safety" – 4:32
"Luddite" – 4:33
"Hollywood" – 2:52
"Long Gone" – 3:19
"Diamond" – 4:46
"4 Down (A Toast)" – 4:46

References

2002 albums
Floater (band) albums
Elemental Records albums